The Hell Tunnel is a  long road tunnel in Trøndelag county, Norway.  The tunnel is located along the shared section of the European route E6 and European route E14 motorways that runs through the mountain Gjevingåsen between the villages of Hommelvik in Malvik municipality and Hell in Stjørdal municipality. 

The tunnel was opened on 18 October 1995 and is the longest of the four tunnels between Trondheim and Stjørdal. It used to have a toll plaza on the southeast side of the tunnel, but now it is all automated, just as with several other tunnels in Norway. The tunnel was built as part of the Trondheim Toll Scheme.

Name
The name of the tunnel comes from the nearby village of Hell. In the Norwegian language, neither the name of the village nor the tunnel has anything to do with the Christian concept of hell. In fact, in Norwegian, the word "hell" means "luck".

References

Malvik
Stjørdal
Road tunnels in Trøndelag
Toll tunnels in Norway
1995 establishments in Norway
European route E6 in Norway
Tunnels completed in 1995